Marcus Wyatt aka goose  (born Honiton, Devon, England) is a British skeleton racer who represents the United Kingdom in the Men's Singles event in the Skeleton World Cup. He finished in the sixth position in the final standing of the 2018-19 Skeleton World Cup. For the 2019–20 Skeleton World Cup Wyatt finished in 8th place in the final standings.

Wyatt earned a degree in psychology from the University of Swansea.

In November 2020, in the race of the 2020–21 Skeleton World Cup season, Wyatt finished third in the world cup race in Siguda, Latvia. It was the first British male skeleton racer podium finish since Dom Parsons' 3rd-place finish at Calgary   in 2013.

Career results

Olympic Games

World Championships

Skeleton World Cup

References

1991 births
Living people
Alumni of Swansea University
English male skeleton racers
Olympic skeleton racers of Great Britain
People from Honiton
Skeleton racers at the 2022 Winter Olympics
Sportspeople from Devon